Aasia Begum, better known as simply Aasia, (13 November 1952 – 9 March 2013) was a Pakistani film actress who was active in the 1970s, 1980s and 1990s.

Early life
Aasia was born in 1952 as Firdous in Patiala, Punjab, India. She emigrated from India to Pakistan. She resided in New York after retiring from her career, where she died on 9 March 2013, aged 60.

Career
She had made her debut in the Pakistani film industry in 1970 in a film by producer Shabab Kiranwi. In the same year, she also acted in film director Riaz Shahid's movie Gharnata (1970). Aasia acted in more than 179 Punjabi movies, including also several Urdu films. Aasia is best remembered for her role of 'Mukkho' in the Punjabi film Maula Jatt (1979). This role redefined the concept of 'Jatti' and 'Chaudhrani' in Pakistani Punjabi language films. In that film, she had based her Punjabi language accent on the Sargodha and Jhang accents.

Personal life
She had married a Karachi-based businessman, and they had four children together.

Death
Aasia quit the film industry in the mid 1990s, and had been residing in New York with her family. She had sought treatment for some health issue in 2011 at the Aga Khan University Hospital, Karachi and then quietly went back to New York. She died on 9 March 2013 in New York aged 60, from undisclosed causes.

Filmography

Film

Awards and honours

See also
List of Pakistani actresses

References

External links
 

1952 births
Actresses in Pashto cinema
2013 deaths
People from Patiala district
Punjabi people
Pakistani film actresses
Actresses in Urdu cinema
Nigar Award winners
20th-century Pakistani actresses
Pakistani emigrants to Canada
21st-century Pakistani actresses
Actresses in Punjabi cinema